Osmundites is an extinct genus of the familia Osmundaceae.  Vascularized seedless plants (ferns) and reproduction by spores. They leaf type fronds. They lived in locals humid and swampy.

Species

 Osmundites brasiliensis: In Brazil, the species was described by Andrews in 1950. It was located in the municipality of Rio Pardo. It's in the geopark Paleorrota in Rio Bonito Formation and date from Sakmarian at Permian.

References

External links 

Prehistoric plant genera
Osmundales